Nils Samuelson Dvergsdal (1842–1921) was a Norwegian politician.

He served as a deputy representative to the Norwegian Parliament between 1895 and 1900, representing the constituency of Nordre Bergenhus Amt and the Moderate Liberal Party. On the local level he was a farmer, mayor of the Jølster municipality and a member of the board of the Fylkesbaatane transport company.

References 

1842 births
1921 deaths
Deputy members of the Storting
Mayors of places in Sogn og Fjordane
Moderate Liberal Party politicians
Norwegian farmers